Great mosque of Algiers may either refer to:

Djamaa el Kebir, an 11th-century mosque
Djamaa el Djazaïr, a 21st-century mosque